Until 1 January 2007 Bramsnæs was a municipality (Danish, kommune) in Roskilde County on the island of Zealand in East Denmark. The municipality, lying between Roskilde Fjord and Isefjord, covered an area of 80 km2, and had a total population of 9,391 (2005). Its last mayor was Flemming Jensen, a member of the Venstre (Liberal Party) political party. The main town and the site of its municipal council was the town of Kirke Hyllinge. To the east is Roskilde Fjord and to the west is Isefjord.

Bramsnæs municipality ceased to exist as the result of Kommunalreformen ("The Municipality Reform" of 2007). It was merged with Hvalsø and Lejre municipalities to form the new Lejre municipality.  This created a municipality with an area of 240 km2 and a total population of 25,971 (2005). The new municipality belongs to the Region Sjælland ("Zealand Region").

Danish-American Islam scholar Patricia Crone (b. 1945) is a native of  Kyndeløse Sydmark, Rye Parish.

External links
 Lejre municipality's official website (Danish only)

References 
 Municipal statistics: NetBorger Kommunefakta, delivered from KMD aka Kommunedata (Municipal Data)
 Municipal mergers and neighbors: Eniro new municipalities map

Former municipalities of Denmark
Lejre Municipality